Codex Vaticanus 266 is one of the most important manuscripts of the treatise On the Soul by Aristotle. It is designated by the symbol V. Paleographically it had been assigned to the 14th century. It is written in Greek minuscule letters. The manuscript contains a complete text of the treatise. It belongs to the textual family κ, but only to Chapter 8. of II book. 

Another member of the family κ: Gc W Hc Nc Jd Oc Zc Vc Wc f Nd Td. 

The manuscript was cited by Trendelenburg, Torstrik, Biehl, and Apelt in his critical editions of the treatise On the Soul. David Ross did not use the manuscript in his own edition. Currently it is housed at the Vatican Library (gr. 266) in Rome.

Other manuscripts 

 Codex Ambrosianus 435
 Codex Coislinianus 386
 Codex Vaticanus 253
 Codex Vaticanus 260

Further reading 

 Paweł Siwek, Aristotelis tractatus De anima graece et latine, Desclée, Romae 1965. 

Manuscripts of the Vatican Library
14th-century manuscripts
Aristotelian manuscripts